Francis Sanford Babbitt (December 22, 1843 – August 22, 1917) was a Massachusetts  politician who served as the fourteenth Mayor of Taunton, Massachusetts.

Babbitt was born in Taunton, Massachusetts to George H. and Seraphene S. Babbitt on December 22, 1843.

Mayor of Taunton
Babbitt ran for the Mayor of Taunton in 1890.  On December 2, 1890, he was elected Mayor as the candidate of the Beau. and Citizen party by a plurality of 193 over Brown, (Ind.).

Notes

References

 Toomey, Daniel P.: Massachusetts of Today: A Memorial of the State, Historical and Biographical, Boston, MA: Columbia Publishing Company, p. 477, (1892).

1843 births
1917 deaths
Mayors of Taunton, Massachusetts
People of Massachusetts in the American Civil War
Members of the Massachusetts House of Representatives
Massachusetts city council members
19th-century American politicians